Hermes DVS is a Dutch omnisport club based in Schiedam. The club has football, cricket, squash and rugby departments.

History

The club was founded on 8 April 1884. They were runners-up in 1951–52 Netherlands Football League Championship. Hermes DVS won the national cricket title in 1938 and 1946, and the women's team won the title in 2014

References

External links
 Official site

 
Cricket teams in the Netherlands
Multi-sport clubs in the Netherlands
Football clubs in the Netherlands
Association football clubs established in 1884
Football clubs in Schiedam
1884 establishments in the Netherlands